Tampere Tigers is a baseball and softball club from Tampere, Finland. The club competes in the two Finnish Baseball Leagues, Suomi Sarja and SM Sarja. Tampere Tigers were founded in 2004 by Arni Hukari and Lassi Autio. The Tigers have also a female softball team and a juniors program for kids 7-13. The Tigers are the current SM Sarja and Softball Finnish Champions.

History 
During its first year the team participated in two exhibition tournaments, winning the second one. The team's name, Tigers, comes from the Japanese baseball team Hanshin Tigers.

Season 2005 was the team's first in the Finnish Baseball League. The team had 18 players, and its win-loss record was 4-11. The Tigers finished 5th in the league of 6 teams. In the award ceremony at the end of the season, Tigers’ Tomi Krogerus was elected the Rookie of the year.

Going into the 2006 season, Tigers set their goal to top-3. They finished 5th in the league, although only 2 wins away from meeting their goal. The best part of the season was the apparent development of their players. In 2006, two members of the Tigers were handed federation awards: Tuomo Mesimäki being the Rookie of the year and Niko Wirgentius the Best batter.

Year 2007 was a huge disappointment for the Tigers. They lost a couple of key players, and only managed one win in 12 games. In the Finnish Cup of baseball they advanced to the semifinal only to lose against the reigning 5-in-a-row league champions Espoo Expos. Tigers played many even games, always losing in the final innings due to the lack of experience.2008 was a historical year, 3 years after initiating its participation in the Finnish league, the team qualified for their first postseason playoff. In a best of three series the team was defeated by the 5 time consecutive champions Espoo Expos. The Tigers showed defiance on its first away game when they managed to take a 3-0 lead by the top of the second inning but gradually lost the grip of the game and succumbed in a 6-14 loss. For the second game at home turf, the high speed pitches of Juha-Pekka Niemi and the precision of Tomi Krogerus were not backed up offensively and the team lost the game and the chances of getting to the finals on a shutout game 7-0. In 2009 the team ended the season with a low winning percentage of .185, with Tommi Harala (SS/P) having the best batting average of the league that year at 0.514 and 11 RBI.

Despite having a record number of players in their roster (28) and the best fielding percentage in the entire league (0.923) the team didn't manage to balance their winning percentage and ended up with a poor .200 in 2010. Despite this, Tommi Harala with an average of 0.529 won the title of Best batter of the league.

In 2011 the team did not participate in the SM Sarja and instead participated for the first time in the Suomi Sarja (First division) with a record of 3 wins, 1 loss and 1 tie (Games had an inning limit)

The Tigers came back to SM Sarja in 2012. At the end of the season the winning percentage was .250 but Andres Mena with an average of 0.512 was awarded the Best batter of the league.

The winning percentage for season 2013 had an increment at .267 and Andres Mena repeated the title of Best batter of the league with an average of 0.500. Teammate Yoan Martinez finished in third place with an average of .426.

There was a considerable improvement in the team's performance in 2014, the winning percentage rose up to .333 and Yoan Martinez became the best batter of the season with an average of 0.528.In 2015, the team returned to Suomi Sarja. After ending the season with a positive record, the team qualified to the postseason, their first in this league and second time in its history. A single game final took place in Espoo where the team couldn't manage to secure the title finishing the season in second place.
In 2016 the Tigers made history and after a second consecutive appearance in the Suomi Sarja finals, they clinched their first title after defeating the City Mets in an exciting final game played in home ground. The team had an almost perfect season, losing only two games and winning 13 in the regular season. A very strong and experienced bullpen and great power in the offensive gave the team their first championship title.

2017 was another historical year for the Tigers. For the first time in its history, the club participated in the two competitive leagues in the country. With a solid offensive team and a great bullpen the team managed to end the SM Sarja season in a historical 3rd place. The team had the most stolen bases in the league and the second best bullpen with an ERA of 5.2. In Suomi Sarja the team clinched the second consecutive title after completing an almost perfect season where they only lost a game. Another historical milestone was accomplished with the establishment of the first softball team in the club with the participation of 9 women. The team had three exhibition games in Tampere.

In 2018 the Tigers showed an improvement in the quality of play. A very strong, record breaking 29 man roaster with great potential. However, luck was not in their favor in terms of results in SM Sarja. Despite a good performance the team lost a lot of games in extra innings and by the minimum difference and that was reflected in their record. The team however managed to qualify for the third time straight to the Suomi Sarja playoffs where they ultimately lost the opportunity to repeat the championship for the third time in a row by losing against their classic rivals Espoo XL5 in the semifinals.

Season 2019 was marked by a historical achievement. For the first time in Club's history the Tigers made it to the SM Sarja finals. With a very talented team and finishing in first place in the regular season on batting average, Slugging and On Base percentage the team managed to qualify to the best of 5 series against Espoo Expos. The experience on these instances and the spot on performance of the Expos bullpen made it impossible for the Tigers to claim their first title and end up losing the series 1-3. Meanwhile in Suomi Sarja, the team managed to qualify for their 5th consecutive postseason appearance. In the best of three series the team failed to win a game and ended up losing the series 0-2 in a series where despite their good production of runs, their bullpen did not respond as well as it had been responding during the regular season. In the end, Tigers concluded 2019 with a silver + silver season, a historical one.Season 2020 was an unusual one. The Tigers finished the regular SM Sarja season in first place for the first time in their history with a record 12 - 2 and a winning percentage of .857. The club however decided to resign from the SM Sarja league while the Final series was underway in protest for alleged irregularities in the way the Baseball Federation managed the league. The allegations included: special rules to automatically suspend players, provocations from members of the federation online and from the bleachers and scheduling final games in the opponent's field. A new Federation Board was brought up in 2020 and investigations were promised. In Suomi Sarja the team full of new players ended the season in third place.
In season 2021 the Club made history after winning the SM Sarja championship for the first time since their foundation, becoming Finnish National Champions after defeating the Espoo Expos three games to one in the Finals. With the same structure of players from the previous year plus the incorporation of key come-backs, the team managed to dominate their rivals and secured the first place in the regular season and win the final series. Another historical achievement was made when the Tigers Softball won the Championship game against the Helsinki Sandstorm to crown themselves as Finnish National Champions. Both teams automatically gained a spot in the European tournaments. The Suomi Sarja (Fat Lizard league) team finished the season in second place, after finishing the regular season in first place and losing the final series 0-2 against Espoo XL5.

2022 was a record breaking for the Tigers in SM Sarja with a winning record of 14-1. The team ended in first place in the regular season but failed to defend their championship and lost the final series 0-3 against Espoo Expos. In Suomi Sarja, the team ended in third place after failing to qualify to the finals in the last game of the regular season. In 2022 the team made history by participating in the European Cup Qualifiers in Kutno, Poland representing Finnish baseball for the first time.

Players 2022 

A combination of experienced players and talented young faces have brought strength and confidence to the team.

Official list of players 

 Roynet Perez
 Sergio Fernandez
 Luis Noyola
 Mauricio Rosales
 Niko Mäki
 Gabriel Rosell
 Willys Reyes
 Pasi Tulonen
 Einieri Mainegra
 Jose Gonzales
 Niklas Palander
 Tommi Harala
 Yendrys Serrano
 Harvey Fernandez
 Juan Carlos Mendez
 Henri Santala
 Corey Niemi
 Adunais Perez
  Williams Kelly
 Juha-Pekka Niemi
 Miikka Aaltonen
  Jyri Portin
 Janne Ylänkö 
 Santeri Heino
 Toni Kemppainen
 Sakari Keskitalo
 Duviel Fernandez
On loan:

 Andres Mena SS
 Jose Mesa C, P, OF, IF

On DL:

 Remberto Martinez

Managers 
The Tigers have had a great selection of managers and coaches. Working together with the Club's board, their main objectives have always been the development of new talents and building up a competitive team for each season.
 2004  Lassi Autio
 2005  Lassi Autio
 2006  Lassi Autio
 2007  Oliver Paredes
 2008  Tuomo Mesimäki
 2009  Lassi Autio
 2010  Aki Ropo
 2011  Lassi Autio
 2012  Aki Ropo
 2013  Andres Mena
 2014  Luis Noyola
 2015  Lassi Autio 
 2016  Mauricio Rosales
 2017  Mauricio Rosales
 2018  Mauricio Rosales
2019  Mauricio Rosales
2020  Mauricio Rosales
2021  Mauricio Rosales
2022  Mauricio Rosales

Former or not currently active players 
	
	
Throughout its history, the team has had an array of extra ordinary players. Some are still active in other teams in Finland and some are playing overseas. Some of the players have had previous experience playing baseball while some others learned to play in the club.

List of former players 
 Severi Lehtimäki  Tuomo Vestola  Simon Visser  Cassie Andersen   Anssi Rämä   Riku Sjöroos  Tuomas  Lemmetty   Markus Blommendahl  Jarkko Vilkkilä  Otto Nojonen Jarkko Juutilainen  Tomi Krogerus  Tommi Harala   Arni Hukari Akira Ropo  Aki Ropo  Toni Sjöman  Oliver Paredes  Juha Kurki  Mikko Salmensuo  Mauno Ahlgren  Jarmo Rintala  Aarne Juutilainen   Olli Mehtonen  Klaus Tamminen  Niko Wirgentius  Tuomo Mesimäki  Abel Maranon   Julian  Hasegawa   Ton Sjöman   Jyrki Nummenmaa   Samuli Ikola  Tomi Karppinen   Kari Harjunniemi   Jarkko Kettunen   Carlos Ardila   Tommi Tuominen   Juha Antikainen   Alberto Martinez  Tommi Sakki  Victor Viloria   Simopekka Vänskä  Marc Phillipe   Tomi Mäntymaa   Tuomas Miskala  Jarkko Mällinen   Harri Moisio   Edvin Suarez   Konsta Eskelinen   Otto Eskelinen  Victor Maso   Antony De la Cruz  Atro-Matti Puruskainen  Heikki Valkama  Toivo Aaltonen   Dayron Lester  Markku Tikka   Teemu Takala  Antti  Kiviniemi   Markus Kailanto   Don Kilpela  Jake Binney  Markku Tikka  Henri Virinsalo  Juuso Valkeala  Jarmo  Rintala  Jarkko Vilkkilä  Mikko Helin  Joni Holmberg  Dennys King  Roope Korhonen  Mikko Siltanen  Samuel Kivi  Narender Kumar  Rafael Espinal  Gilberto Ruiz  Silvio Guarat  Jeremi Rannikko  Riku Katajamäki  Eemi Huhtinen  Jani Aaltonen  Wilmer Wilson   Elwin Rosario  Yoan Martinez  Martin Magris  Lassi Autio  Silvio Quevedo  Teo Scheepstra  Tauno Koppel  Camilla Lehtimäki  Roberto Martinez  Sidney Kitchen  Vicente Herrera  Heidi Rimpi  Yuber Fajardo  Petteri Peijonen  Tuomas Virtanen  Patrick Carney  Christian Camacho
Some of the players in this list become available and return to the team to play in a particular season while some others have already retired from the sport.

Statistics

Tigers SM Sarja record

Tigers Suomi Sarja record

Post-season record 

The team won its first final in 2016.

2008:

SM Sarja playoff

Lost playoff series 0-2 vs Espoo Expos

2015:

Suomi Sarja final

Lost single final game 14-5 vs Espoo XL5

2016:

Suomi Sarja Final

Win single final game 8-5 vs Helsinki City

Note: In 2017 there was no post-season scheduled. The team won the title by winning more games (14) than the rest of the teams in the regular season

2018:

Suomi Sarja Playoffs

Win wildcard game 15-5 vs Nokia White Sox

Lost final series 0-2 vs Espoo XL5

2019:

Suomi Sarja final series

Lost final series 0-2 vs Espoo XL5SM Sarja final series

Lost final series 1-3 vs Espoo Expos

2020:

SM Sarja final series

Lost final series 0-3 vs Espoo Expos (Forfeiting games 2 and 3)

2021:

SM Sarja final series

Win final series 3-1 vs Espoo Expos

Suomi Sarja final series

Lost final series 0-2 vs Espoo XL5

Softball Championship game

Win final game 14-9 against Helsinki Sandstorm  

2022:  

SM Sarja final series

Lost final series 0-3 vs Espoo Expos

Titles 
 2016: Suomi Sarja Champions
 2017: Suomi Sarja Champions
2021: SM Sarja Champions
2021: Softball National Champions

See also 
 :fi:Baseballin SM-sarja

References 
Finnish Baseball Federation (info, scores, statistics)

https://finland.wbsc.org/en/events/2022-sm-sarja/teams

External links 
  
 Finnish Baseball Federation (info, scores, statistics)
 https://finland.wbsc.org/en/events/2022-sm-sarja/teams
 https://finland.wbsc.org/en/events/2022-fat-lizard-league/schedule-and-results

2004 establishments in Finland
Baseball teams in Finland
Sports clubs established in 2004